Jamaluddin Hossain (born 14 October 1943) is a Bangladeshi actor, director and theater activist. He was awarded the Ekushey Padak by the Government of Bangladesh in 2013.

Education and career
Hossain studied in Chittagong College and Bangladesh University of Engineering and Technology. He was a classmate of actor Abul Hayat in these institutions.

Hossain was a member of Nagarik Natya Sampradaya, a theater troupe from 1975 until 1995. In 1997, he started his own troupe Nagarik Natyangan Ensamble and has been serving as its general secretary. He was the presidium member of the Bangladesh Group Theatre Federation (BGTF) and general secretary of the Betar Television Shilpi Sangsad.

Works
Hossain directed notable theater plays including Khanchar Bhitor Achin Pakhi, Raja Rani, Chand Boniker Pala, Ami Noi, Bibishab and Jugol Bondi.

Personal life
Hossain is married to actress Rowshan Ara Hussain since 1975. They met while they were the members of the theater troupe Nagarik Natya Sampradaya.

References

External links
 

Living people
1943 births
Bangladesh University of Engineering and Technology alumni
Bangladeshi theatre directors
Bangladeshi male television actors
Bangladeshi male stage actors
Recipients of the Ekushey Padak